Vanessa Menga (born 10 October 1976) is a former professional tennis player from Brazil.

Born in São Paulo, she started playing tennis at the age of 4, when she went to an academy along with her father. At the age of 14, Menga went to train tennis in Barcelona, where she won her first doubles championship.

She's the only Brazilian female tennis player to play in two Summer Olympic Games, Atlanta 1996 (doubles with Miriam D’Agostini, falling in round 1), and Sydney 2000 (with Joana Cortez, falling in round 2). Menga was also in two Pan American Games, Mar Del Plata 1995 and Winnipeg 1999, where she won the doubles gold medal with Joana Cortez.

In 2001, Menga posed for Playboy Brazil. In 2003, she retired from tennis after a motorcycle accident which left her for eight months without playing. Menga now has an institute in São Paulo where she teaches tennis to over 200 children, and participates in other charity projects.

ITF finals

Singles: 9 (3–6)

Doubles: 54 (33–21)

References

Globoesporte

External links
 Official website
 
 

1976 births
Brazilian female tennis players
Living people
Olympic tennis players of Brazil
Tennis players from São Paulo
Tennis players at the 1996 Summer Olympics
Tennis players at the 1999 Pan American Games
Tennis players at the 2000 Summer Olympics
Pan American Games gold medalists for Brazil
Pan American Games medalists in tennis
Medalists at the 1999 Pan American Games
20th-century Brazilian women
21st-century Brazilian women